Friedel Dzubas (April 20, 1915 in Berlin, Germany – December 10, 1994 in Auburndale, Massachusetts) was a German-born American abstract painter.

Life and work

Friedel Dzubas studied art in his native land before fleeing Nazi Germany in 1939 and settling in New York City.  In Manhattan during the early 1950s, he shared a studio with fellow abstract painter Helen Frankenthaler. He began exhibiting his Abstract expressionist paintings at this time.

His work was included in the Ninth Street Show in New York City in 1951, and in group exhibitions at the Leo Castelli gallery, the Stable Gallery, and the Tibor de Nagy Gallery among others. After the Ninth Street Show annual invitational exhibitions were held at the Stable Gallery throughout the 1950s. The poster of the second New York Painting and Sculpture Annual at The Stable Gallery in 1953, included an introduction by Clement Greenberg:<ref>[http://albertkotin.com/stable1953.jpg Stable Gallery 1953 Poster’’] </ref>

In the 1960s he became associated with Color field painting and Lyrical Abstraction. He was included in Post-painterly abstraction'' a 1964 exhibition curated by Clement Greenberg. Dzubas was a friend of Clement Greenberg, who in turn introduced him to Jackson Pollock and other artists.

During the last three decades of his career, Dzubas had more than sixty solo exhibitions around the world. He was represented by the André Emmerich gallery and Knoedler Contemporary Arts in New York for more than thirty years. His works were  exhibited at galleries including the Anita Shapolsky Gallery and the 
Jacobson Howard Gallery in New York City. In 1976 he settled in Massachusetts, but also painted and lived in New York City, where his paintings were regularly exhibited.

Technique
Dzubas used Magna paint, an acrylic paint favored by many of the artist's peers over oil paint, from 1966 onward. The artist would apply thick layers of color over washes, scrubbing the paint into the unprimed canvas. Dzubas used staining, brushing and other ways of applying color. His paintings were generally large in size and scale, but he made many very small paintings as well.

Teaching
He was a teacher and lecturer at:
 1962 Dartmouth College, Hanover, New Hampshire;
 1965–66, Institute of Humanistic Studies, Aspen (now Aspen Institute);
 1968–69, University of Pennsylvania, Philadelphia;
 1969–1970s, Cornell University, Ithaca, New York;
he had the longest relationship with the School of the Museum of Fine Arts, Boston, where he taught from 1976 to 1983.

Selected Museum collections
Whitney Museum of American Art, New York
Guggenheim Museum, New York
San Francisco Museum of Modern Art, California
Everson Museum of Art, Syracuse, New York
Yale University Art Gallery, New Haven, Connecticut
Smithsonian American Art Museum, Washington, D.C.
Lowe Art Museum, Coral Gables, Florida
Georgia Museum of Art, Athens, Georgia
Rose Art Museum of Brandeis University, Waltham, Massachusetts
Kemper Museum of Contemporary Art, Kansas City, Missouri
Newark Museum, Newark, New Jersey
Princeton University Art Museum, Princeton, New Jersey
Albright-Knox Art Gallery, Buffalo, New York
Herbert F. Johnson Museum of Art, Ithaca, New York
Parrish Art Museum, Southampton, New York
Portland Art Museum, Portland, Oregon
Museum of Fine Arts, Houston, Texas
Boston Museum of Fine Arts, Massachusetts
Metropolitan Museum of Art, New York
Boca Raton Museum of Art, Boca Raton, Florida

Awards
 1966 Guggenheim Fellowship,
 1968 Guggenheim Fellowship
 1968 National Council on the Arts Award

See also
Color field painting
Lyrical Abstraction
New York School
Abstract expressionism

References

External links
Estate of Friedel Dzubas
Biography for Friedel Dzubas
Collection of artwork by Friedel Dzubas at Art Net
 Marika Herskovic, New York School Abstract Expressionists Artists Choice by Artists, (New York School Press, 2000.) . p. 16; p. 36; pp. 122–125

1915 births
1994 deaths
Abstract painters
Artists from New York (state)
20th-century American painters
American male painters
American contemporary painters
20th-century American male artists